Victoria Tunnel may refer to:

 Victoria Tunnel (Liverpool), England
 Victoria Tunnel (Newcastle), England
 Victoria Tunnel, Queensland, Australia
 Mount Victoria Tunnel, Wellington, New Zealand